The Medal of Major Milan Tepić is a Medal of Republika Srpska. It was established in 1993 by the Constitution of Republika Srpska and 'Law on orders and awards' valid since 28 April 1993.

The Medal is awarded to members of the Army of Republika Srpska who showed bravery in battle.

It is named after Milan Tepić.

See also 
 Milan Tepić
 Orders, decorations and medals of Republika Srpska

References

Orders, decorations, and medals of Republic of Srpska
Awards established in 1993